The Berlin S-Bahn began on 8 August 1924 with the first section from Stettiner Vorortbahnhof to Bernau using steam locomotives. On 13 August 1961 it was broken up when the Berlin Wall was built, resulting in two sections: the eastern part and the western part. The western part experienced a massive strike which resulted in closure of several stations, after declining use. Attempts were made to reopen at various times but in the end, only three lines were finally opened after the strike. Since 9 November 1989, when the Berlin Wall was opened, the Berlin S-Bahn began to expand rapidly with their budgetary costs.

Before S-Bahn 
The first line was opened from Zehlendorf to Potsdam in 1838. Until 1846, the city already counted five terminal stations, one of which resulted in almost all routes. Until 1882 four more stations were added. In order to connect the lines together, in 1851, the Berlin connection path along the former city wall was built at ground level. They circumnavigated the urban area in a three-quarter circle from Stettiner, the Hamburger, the Potsdamer and Anhalter Bahnhof to the Frankfurt train station. The constant traffic, particularly by the military, disabled strongly in passenger transport by road, so a new solution was contemplated.

The Berlin Ringbahn was opened on 1870s, followed by the true Berlin Stadtbahn which goes from Schlesischen Bahnhof to Charlottenburg. The rapid growth of the city and suburban traffic grew immensely. In the following years, other sections to Bernau and Königs Wusterhausen were provided with a second pair of track.

With individual sections dating from the 1870s, the S-Bahn was formed by and by as the network of suburban commuter railways running into Berlin, then interconnected by the circular railway connecting the various terminal railway stations, and in 1882 enhanced by the east–west cross-city line (called the  "Stadtbahn", "city railway"). The forming of a distinct identity for this network began with the establishment of a special tariff for the area which was then called the "Berliner Stadt-, Ring- und Vorortbahnen", and which differed from the normal railway tariff. While the regular railway tariff was based on multiplying the distance covered with a fixed price per kilometer, the special tariff for this Berlin tariff zone was based on a graduated tariff based on the number of stations touched during the travel.

Electrification
The core of this network, that is the cross-city ("Stadtbahn") East-West line and the circular Ringbahn, and several suburban branches were converted from steam operation to a third-rail electric railway in the latter half of the 1920s. The Wannsee railway, the suburban line with the highest number of passengers, was electrified in 1932/33. A number of suburban trains remained under steam, even after the Second World War.

Timeline of electrifications

S-Bahn in Adolf Hitler's time (1933 - 1945)
After building the east–west cross-city line connecting western suburban lines, which until then terminated at Charlottenburg station with eastern suburban lines which terminated at Frankfurter Bahnhof (later Schlesischer Bahnhof), the logical next step was a north–south cross-city line connecting the northern suburban lines terminating at Stettiner Bahnhof with the southern suburban lines terminating at the substations of the Berlin Potsdamer Bahnhof. The first ideas for this project emerged only 10 years after the completion of the east–west cross-city line, with several concrete proposals resulting from a 1909 competition held by the Berlin city administration. Another concrete proposal, already very close to the final realisation, was put forth in 1926 by the Breslau university professor Jenicke.

The decision to build was taken in 1933, as part of the public works programme undertaken by the new Nazi government to reduce unemployment. The projects do include:
Construction of this Nord-Süd-S-Bahn (North-South S-Bahn), as it was called, began in 1934, with a tunnel from Berlin Anhalter Bahnhof to Berlin Stettiner Bahnhof (today 'Nordbahnhof') as its core section. A first phase, from the north to Unter den Linden was opened just in time for the 1936 Berlin Olympics; the southern section, via Potsdamer Platz, opened the month after the Second World War began, in October 1939.
Construction of the Ost-West S-Bahn, which is supposed to go from Anhalter Bahnhof to Görlitzer Bahnhof via Oranienplatz, and to join Görlitzer Bahn.
Extension of the suburban lines to Rangsdorf, Lichterfelde, and Reichssportfield.

During and after World War II 

Many sections of the S-Bahn were closed during the war owing to enemy action. The Nord-Süd-Bahn tunnel was flooded on 2 May 1945 by retreating SS troops during the final Battle of Berlin. The exact number of casualties is not known, but up to 200 people are presumed to have perished, since the tunnel was used as a public shelter and also served to house military wounded in trains on underground sidings. Service through the tunnel commenced again in 1947.

After hostilities ceased in 1945, Berlin was given special status as a "Four-Sector City," surrounded by the Soviet Occupation Zone, which later became the German Democratic Republic (GDR).  The Allies had decided that S-Bahn service in the western sectors of Berlin should continue to be provided by the Reichsbahn (DR), which was by now the provider of railway services in East Germany. (Rail services in West Germany proper were provided by the new Deutsche Bundesbahn.)

During the war, Berlin S-Bahn cars were overhauled at Luben to the east of Berlin. Since that town, now known as Lubin, was ceded to Poland under the terms of the Potsdam Agreement in 1945, 84 cars currently in the works were thus lost by Berlin. Further cars were sent east as war reparations, and eventually at least 287 cars were sent to the Soviet Union where they were converted for use in Moscow, Kiev, and Tallinn. Additionally at least 80 two-car sets were retained in Poland, where they were used on suburban services in the Gdańsk-Gdynia region until 1976. Some of the latter cars were then converted for use in overhead line maintenance trains, and some still exist in that role. One set is preserved in its Gdańsk-Gdynia condition at a museum at Kościerzyna near Gdynia.

New stretches 

The first new railway line will be recorded in March 1947 after the war; yet while the car hastily repaired, dismantled tracks and have been rebuilt, was already on the 7th. From Mahlsdorf it was a station further into the Brandenburg and Hoppegarten. Approximately one and a half years later, Strausberg also connected to the grid. The construction proceeded quickly as preparations had been already made for this purpose.

After the end of the war, most of the depots in West Berlin were planned. There will be new stretches such as Jungfernheide – Spandau – Staaken/Falkensee, Lichterfelde Süd – Teltow, and also Grünau – Königs-Wusterhausen. The steam-powered suburban traffic was mostly withdrawn on the routes concerned until the new endpoint of the S-Bahn.

Before the construction of the Berlin Wall, the Berlin S-Bahn continued to expand regularly:

Cold War 
As relations between East and West began to sour with the coming of the Cold War, the Berlin S-Bahn soon became a victim of the hostilities. Although services continued operating through all occupation sectors, checkpoints were constructed on the borders with East Berlin and on-board "customs checks" were carried out on trains. From 1958 onward, some S-Bahn trains ran non-stop through the western sectors from stations in East Berlin to stations on outlying sections in East Germany so as to avoid the need for such controls. East German government employees were then forbidden to use the S-Bahn since it travelled through West Berlin.

The western sectors of the city were physically cut off from East Germany on 13 August 1961, by what was later called the Berlin Wall, in a well-prepared plan to separate the two halves of the city – and at the same time, to divide the Berlin public transit network into two separate systems.

Stadtbahn services were curtailed from both directions at Friedrichstraße station. This station was divided into two physically separated areas, one for eastern passengers and one for westerners. Although the station lay within East Berlin, western passengers could transfer between S-Bahn lines or to the U-Bahn without passing through border checks, much like passengers changing planes at an international airport. The GDR also operated an Intershop in the portion of the station with services to and from West Berlin, where persons arriving from West Berlin (again without passing through border controls) could buy luxury goods such as tobacco and alcoholic beverages at discounted prices (compared to prices in West Berlin), provided they paid in hard currency, in part because Intershop customers did not pay West German taxes on their purchases. The West Berlin authorities were aware of this situation but did not impose stringent customs controls on such purchases out of political considerations. Friedrichstraße station also became the main entry point for train and U-Bahn passengers from West Berlin into East Berlin.

Similarly, selected sections on the Berlin S-Bahn together with the Ringbahn were cut at the borders of West and East Berlin; border fortifications such as a locked door were put up between the designated stations. These included:

Spandau West – Albrechtshof (West Berlin - East Germany), the remainder of the section (Albrechtshof - Falkensee) was cut on 9 October 1961
Heiligensee – Hennigsdorf (West Berlin - East Germany), the remainder of the section (Hennigsdorf - Velten) was cut in 1984
Frohnau – Hohen Neuendorf (West Berlin - East Germany), the remainder of the section (Hohen Neuendorf - Oranienburg) was extended on 19 November 1961
Lichtenrade – Mahlow (West Berlin - East Germany), the remainder of the section (Mahlow - Rangsdorf) was cut on 25 August 1961
Lichterfelde Süd – Teltow (West Berlin - East Germany)
Wannsee – Stahnsdorf (West Berlin - East Germany)
Wannsee – Griebnitzsee (West Berlin - East Germany), the remainder of the section (Griebnitzsee - Potsdam Stadt) was cut on 9 October 1961
Gesundbrunnen – Schönhauser Allee (Ringbahn)
Bornholmer Straße – Pankow (the middle tracks were sealed with a fence, another compensatory track from Pankow to Schönhauser Allee was built as a result)
Sonnenallee – Treptower Park (Ringbahn)
Köllnische Heide – Baumschulenweg (Ringbahn)

DR and BVG had discussed separate arrangements for the Nord-Süd-Bahn by restricting travel to West Berliners only as it passed through the East Berlin territory in the city centre, and it did not stop at underground East Berlin S-Bahn stations, which were called ghost stations. Two armed guards were positioned at all ghost stations to ensure that no passengers jumped aboard trains or smashed windows to allow escape from East Berlin. Only some maintenance works on the Nord-Süd-Bahn were allowed between 1961 and 1989, and trains had to slow down to 60 km/h instead of the normal speed limit. Bornholmer Straße was also a ghost station, because the exits were only towards the border crossing.

West Berlin Situation

Berlin S-Bahn strike in 1980

Because the S-Bahn was operated by the DR, West Berliners vented their frustration at the building of the wall by boycotting the S-Bahn since its fares were seen as subsidising the communist regime in the East. "Keinen Pfennig mehr für Ulbricht," or "not a penny more for Ulbricht," became the S-Bahn opponents' chant. Within days of the Berlin Wall being built, the BVG, with assistance from other transit companies in West Germany, began providing "solidarity-with-Berlin buses" – new bus services that parallelled the S-Bahn lines and therefore provided an alternative. After many years of declining passenger use and difficult industrial relations between the West Berlin workforce and their East Berlin employers, most of the western portion of the S-Bahn was closed down on 11 September 1980 following a strike.

A 20-minute service was still provided on the Stadtbahn from Westkreuz to Friedrichstraße as well as services on the Nord-Süd-Bahn between Frohnau, Friedrichstraße, Lichtenrade, or Wannsee. The following routes were also cut after the strike on 22 September 1980:

Gesundbrunnen – Jungfernheide – Westkreuz – Schöneberg – Sonnenallee / Köllnische Heide (reopening in 1993 to 2002)
Westkreuz – Olympiastadion – Spandau (reopening in 1999)
Spandau – Staaken
Jungfernheide – Gartenfeld (Siemensbahn)
Jungfernheide – Spandau
Zehlendorf – Düppel

The S1 section from Wannsee to Anhalter Bahnhof was therefore reopened in 1984.

The only sections that were left opened after the strike do include:
Frohnau – Gesundbrunnen – Friedrichstraße – Anhalter Bf – Lichtenrade (N I)
Heiligensee – Gesundbrunnen – Friedrichstraße – Anhalter Bf – Lichterfelde Süd (N II)
Wannsee – Westkreuz – Charlottenburg – Zoologischer Garten – Friedrichstraße (S I)

The 1980 incidents turned media and political attention toward what was left of West Berlin's S-Bahn network. The city government decided to enter negotiations with East Germany, which were finally successful.

S-Bahn in the BVB
By contrast, during the same period, services on the S-Bahn in East Berlin were increased and new lines built as housing projects expanded eastward from the city centre. With most of the U-Bahn located in West Berlin, the S-Bahn became the backbone of the East Berlin transit network.

The DR has purchased DR Class 270 as a result, where it is only cut short to 166 trains and the last orders were delivered in 1991. The remaining orders were cancelled after the reunification.

The extended 40 kilometres of the Berlin S-Bahn with expansion in the east are denoted as follows:

BVG took over the S-Bahn in West Berlin

On January 9, 1984, the BVG took over responsibility for the operation of S-Bahn services in West Berlin. After further closures that same day, a limited service was restored, initially comprising only two short sections with no direct interchange between them. In the years between 1984 and 1989, several sections were gradually reopened, resulting in a network of 71 km (44 mi) and three lines – with one line running on the Stadtbahn and two on the Nord-Süd-Bahn – comprising about 50% of West Berlin's original network. This development brought West Berlin's S-Bahn back into public awareness and restored its popularity.

BVG had also ordered BVG Class 480 for operations in the western part of the area since 1987 to replace some of the older rundown trains (Class 475, 476 and 477).

S1: Anhalter Bahnhof - Wannsee
S2: Frohnau - Lichtenrade
S3: Wannsee - Friedrichstraße

BVG planned to open Berlin S-Bahn in the west, which is planned from 1984 to 1992, but was shelved before the opening of the Berlin Wall, the S-Bahn should be grown to about 117 km.

Neukölln – Köllnische Heide
Jungfernheide – Gartenfeld
Jungfernheide – Spandau
Schönholz – Heiligensee
Zehlendorf – Düppel

Until 1984, all Berlin S-Bahn routes were allocated letters as a means of identifying the route of the train. These letters were occasionally followed by Roman numerals to indicate a short working or bifurcation in the service (e.g., A, BI, BII, C,) and are still used internally by the Berlin S-Bahn GmbH for timetabling and in conjunction with radio call-signs to each train unit. When the BVG took over the responsibility for the operation of S-Bahn services in West Berlin in 1984, it introduced a new unified numbering scheme for both the S-Bahn and the U-Bahn, which it also operated. Existing U-Bahn route numbers were prefixed with the letter U, while the new S-Bahn route numbers were prefixed with the letter S. This system of numbering routes was used in other West German cities and was extended to the S-Bahn service for the whole city after reunification.

Reunification 

After the Berlin Wall came down in November 1989, the first broken links were re-established, with Friedrichstraße on 1 July 1990, as the first. The BVG and DR jointly marketed the services soon after the reunification. Administratively, the divided S-Bahn networks remained separate in this time of momentous changes, encompassing German reunification and reunification of Berlin into a single city, although the dividing line was no longer the former Berlin Wall. DR and BVG (of the whole of reunified Berlin from 1 January 1992, after absorbing BVB of East Berlin) operated individual lines end to end, both into the other party's territories. For example, S2 was all BVG even after it was extended northward and southward into Brandenburg/former East German territory. The main east–west route (Stadtbahn) was a joint operation. Individual trains were operated by either BVG or DR end-to-end on the same tracks. This arrangement ended on 1 January 1994, with the creation of Deutsche Bahn due to the merger between DR and the former West Germany's Deutsche Bundesbahn. All S-Bahn operations in Berlin were transferred to the newly formed S-Bahn Berlin GmbH as a subsidiary of Deutsche Bahn, and the BVG withdrew from running S-Bahn services.

Technically, a number of projects followed in the steps of re-establishing broken links in order to restore the former S-Bahn network to its 1961 status after 1990, especially the Ringbahn. In December 1997 the connection between Neukölln and Treptower Park via Sonnenallee was reopened, enabling S4 trains to run 75% of the whole ring between Schönhauser Allee and Jungfernheide. On 16 June 2002, the section Gesundbrunnen – Westhafen also reopened, re-establishing the Ringbahn operations.

Service reductions
On 20 July 2009, known locally as "Black Monday," the S-Bahn service was significantly reduced owing to safety checks on the trains ordered by the German Federal Railway Authority. These checks were ordered because of an accident on 3 May 2009, involving an S-Bahn train. Maintenance for this train was delayed by 2 years, symptomatic for the strategy to cut spending in the Deutsche Bahn subsidiary. Having so many trains taken out of service for inspection left less than 30 percent of the system's rolling stock available for revenue service. Eight routes, including most through services on the Stadtbahn, were closed, and on other lines headways were reduced to 20 minutes and trains shortened.

Some minor restorations in service were made on 3 August 2009. Owing to new inspection troubles the S-Bahn network was again reduced dramatically on 8 September 2009 when 75% of the trains were withdrawn from service for inspection and faulty brake cylinders. There were again no trains on the Stadtbahn between Westkreuz and Alexanderplatz and no S-Bahn trains to Spandau. Other routes were running with extended intervals and reduced distances.

In late 2009, the Berlin Senate expected that normal operations would only resume in 2013. In January 2010, DB announced that they expected the system to resume normal service in December 2010 and employed 300 new staff in their workshops. In the same month, the Berlin transport Senator Ingeborg Junge-Reyer rejected an extension of the traffic contract with the operator Deutsche Bahn (DB) which is due to expire in December 2017.

By spring of 2011, some 420 train sets were in service, a considerable improvement over the situation in 2009 but still insufficient compared to the 500 needed to provide a normal full service. The S-Bahn announced it was to invest €120 million to achieve the goal of 500 train sets in service by December 2011. Rüdiger Grube, the head of the DB, announced that losses due to the S-Bahn crisis had reached €370 million at the end of 2010. He expected them to reach €700 million by the end of 2014, with no operating profits to be made before the end of the contract in December 2017.

MTR Corporation, National Express Group, Berlin S-Bahn GmbH and RATP Development had tendered for their procurement process, and were soon followed by train manufacturer Stadler Rail for their operations from 2018 to 2033. The specific contracts are:

Ringbahn -
S41 Südkreuz - Südkreuz (clockwise Ring)
S42 Südkreuz - Südkreuz (anticlockwise Ring)
S46 Berlin Main Station - Westend - Königs Wusterhausen
S47 Spindlersfeld – Südkreuz, and
S8 Hohen Neuendorf - Zeuthen
Stadtbahn -
S3 Erkner - Ostkreuz
S5 Spandau - Strausberg-Nord
S7 Ahrensfelde - Wannsee
S75 Wartenberg - Westkreuz
S9 Berlin-Schönefeld - Pankow
Nord-Süd Bahn -
S1 Potsdam - Oranienburg
S2 Blankenfelde - Bernau
S25 Teltow Stadt - Hennigsdorf
S45 Berlin-Schönefeld - Südkreuz
S85 Grünau - Waidmannslust

Infrastructure work
Starting in 2010, DB Netz is replacing mechanical train stops on the S-Bahn network with electronic balises. The track-side installation of new ZBS train control system shall be completed in 2015 whereas there is migration phase for train operation up to 2025.

References

S-Bahn 
Berlin S-Bahn 
Berlin S-Bahn